The 1st Standing Committee of the Supreme People's Assembly (SPA) was elected by the 1st Session of the 1st Supreme People's Assembly on 10 September 1948. It was replaced on 20 September 1957 by the 2nd SPA Standing Committee.

Members

1st Session (1948–53)

6th Session (1953–57)

References

Citations

Bibliography
Books:
 

1st Supreme People's Assembly
Presidium of the Supreme People's Assembly
1948 establishments in North Korea
1957 disestablishments in North Korea